Link Belt station is a station along the SEPTA Lansdale/Doylestown Line. It is located at County Line Road & Walnut Street in Chalfont, Pennsylvania. It is located on the Montgomery County side of County Line Road, north of Pennsylvania Route 309, and sits next to the popular "Whistle Stop Park."  In FY 2013, Link Belt station had a weekday average of 46 boardings and 66 alightings.

The Link Belt station was created by the Reading Railroad to service the Link Belt Company plant built across West Walnut Street from the rail line in 1952, opening formally on December 2. Link-Belt is a crane manufacturer currently based in Lexington, Kentucky. 
On December 18, 2011, weekend service was discontinued at this station due to low ridership.

Station layout

References

External links
SEPTA – Link Belt Station
Link Belt SEPTA Station (World-NYC Subways.org)
 Station from Google Maps Street View

SEPTA Regional Rail stations
Stations on the Doylestown Line
Former Reading Company stations
Railway stations in the United States opened in 1952
Railway stations in Montgomery County, Pennsylvania